Tufanganj Government Polytechnic, established in 2014, is a government polytechnic located in Tufanganj, Cooch Behar district, West Bengal.

Info
This polytechnic is affiliated to the West Bengal State Council of Technical Education, and recognised by AICTE, New Delhi. This polytechnic offers diploma courses in Mechanical Engineering, Survey Engineering and Civil Engineering with an intake of 60 per each.

It is equipped with a Machine Shop, Fitting Shop , Fluid Power Laboratory along with a Computer Laboratory.

The very first batch of this institute has passed in 2017.

Location
It is located in Chamta(Urban Area of Tufanganj) which is 2 km away South from Tufanganj Town. It is also located nearby Tufanganj Railway Station. College Campus is situated on the Tufanganj-Balabhut Road.

See also

References

External links 
 
Official website WBSCTE

Universities and colleges in Cooch Behar district
Educational institutions established in 2014
2014 establishments in West Bengal
Technical universities and colleges in West Bengal